Fabián Rodrigo Yantorno Blengio (born 4 September 1982) is a former Uruguayan professional footballer who last played as a midfielder for Sud América. Yantorno has played for several clubs in South America and the United Kingdom.

Club career
Yantorno was born on 4 September 1982, in Montevideo, Uruguay. He first moved to Scotland when he joined Scottish Premier League newcomers Gretna in June 2007 from Uruguayan First Division club Miramar Misiones. In February 2008 Yantorno was ruled out for the rest of the season due to a serious knee injury. He was released by Gretna because they were unable to afford his rehabilitation.

Hibernian then offered him the use of their medical and training facilities, and he signed a two-year contract with them on 8 August 2008. He struggled to secure a place in the Hibs first team, and during January a loan to Hamilton Academical for the rest of the 2008–09 season was arranged. The deal was cancelled, however, as Hamilton had already signed one senior player (Paul McGowan) on loan from a Scottish Premier League club and were therefore unable to sign Yantorno on loan. Yantorno did not feature for Hibs after that, and the club declined their option to extend his contract for another season. Yantorno signed for Conference National team Chester City on 15 July 2009, but was released on 3 September due to his failure to overcome a knee injury.

He joined League One club Hartlepool United on trial in July 2010 and signed a permanent deal at the club on the eve of the 2010–11 season, subject to international clearance. He scored his first goal for Hartlepool in a 4–1 Football League Trophy defeat against Sheffield Wednesday on 10 November 2010.

In May 2011 he was not offered a new contract by the club, along with nine other players from the 2010/11 squad.

In February 2012, he signed a new deal with Uruguayan Primera División side Rentistas. Yantorno moved to Colombian club Atlético Bucaramanga later in 2012.

Notes

References

External links
Fabián Yantorno profile at Vital Hartlepool

1982 births
Living people
Footballers from Montevideo
Uruguayan footballers
Uruguayan expatriate footballers
Association football midfielders
C.A. Bella Vista players
A.S. Sambenedettese players
Miramar Misiones players
Gretna F.C. players
Hibernian F.C. players
Chester City F.C. players
Atenas de San Carlos players
Hartlepool United F.C. players
Sud América players
Atlético Bucaramanga footballers
C.A. Rentistas players
Uruguayan Primera División players
Uruguayan Segunda División players
Scottish Premier League players
English Football League players
Categoría Primera B players
Uruguayan expatriate sportspeople in Italy
Uruguayan expatriate sportspeople in Scotland
Uruguayan expatriate sportspeople in England
Uruguayan expatriate sportspeople in Colombia
Expatriate footballers in Italy
Expatriate footballers in Scotland
Expatriate footballers in England
Expatriate footballers in Colombia